Todd Spitzer (born November 26, 1960) is an American attorney and politician serving as the district attorney of Orange County, California. Spitzer successfully ran for Orange County district attorney in 2018 against incumbent Tony Rackauckas. Spitzer had previously served as a deputy district attorney from 1990 to 1996 and, under Rackauckas, as assistant district attorney from 2008 to 2010.

Spitzer was previously an Orange County supervisor from 1997 to 2002 and again from 2012 to 2018. He was also a member of the California State Assembly from 2002 to 2006, serving three terms representing California's 71st assembly district. As an assemblyman, he co-wrote California's Megan's Law. He also served as spokesman and campaign manager for the successful campaign to pass Marsy's Law in a 2008 initiative.

Early life and education 
Todd Spitzer was born on November 26, 1960, in Whittier, California, to Phyllis Ann and Leonard Spitzer. He has a sister, Susan, who also went on to be an attorney. Todd played leading roles in the Schurr High School department of performance arts' productions of the musicals Hello, Dolly! (1975) and Li'l Abner (1976).

Spitzer attended the University of California, Los Angeles, graduating with a bachelor's degree in 1982. He then completed a fellowship at the California State Senate. In 1984–85, Spitzer worked as an English teacher at Theodore Roosevelt High School in the Los Angeles Unified School District.
He graduated in 1989 with a master's degree in public policy from the University of California, Berkeley, and a Juris Doctor from the University of California, Hastings College of the Law. While at Hastings, Spitzer was awarded the George Moscone Fellowship, given to law students dedicating their career to public service.

Career

Early career 
Spitzer joined the Orange County District Attorney's office in 1990 as deputy district attorney. He has prosecuted felonies including attempted murder, attempted rape, kidnapping, robbery, extortion, and reckless driving causing serious bodily injury. Spitzer has tried about 100 jury trials to verdict. He served in the position until 1996.

From 1990 to 2000, Spitzer also served as a volunteer reserve police officer in the Los Angeles Police Department. Spitzer's first elected office was as a trustee to the Brea Olinda School Board in 1992. Serving in the position until 1996, he investigated a grading scandal at Brea Olinda High School involving a former registrar changing students' grades to enhance their chances of getting into college.

Orange County Board of Supervisors 

In 1996, Spitzer ran against Assemblyman Mickey Conroy in a heated election for the 3rd supervisorial district seat on the Orange County Board of Supervisors. Described by Los Angeles Times as "a decided underdog", Spitzer came in second in the March 1996 primary among seven candidates, leading to a general election between him and Conroy. Spitzer won the general election and was sworn-in in January 1997.

While serving on the board, he successfully opposed the conversion of the Marine Corps Air Station El Toro into an international airport and instead advocated for a "Millennium Plan" for a mixed-use commercial and residential development for the  property. Spitzer also advocated for the immediate release of a map of registered sex offenders living in Orange County.

California State Assembly 
In 2002, Spitzer ran for a seat in the California State Assembly to represent the 71st assembly district. He was challenged by the Democratic candidate Bea Foster, a teacher from Santa Ana. After defeating Foster in the election, Spitzer was sworn into the State Assembly on December 2, 2002.

As an assemblyman, Spitzer served on the judiciary and public safety committees and was a proponent for stronger legislation against sex offenders. In April 2004, he co-wrote Megan's Law for tougher penalties for people convicted of sex offenses and co-wrote legislation to publish the registered sex offenders database on the Internet.

Spitzer was re-elected to the State Assembly in November 2004, defeating Bea Foster again with a vote margin of 69.1% to 30.9%. In 2006, Spitzer served as co-chair of the High Risk Sex Offender Task Force, formed by Governor Arnold Schwarzenegger to review the law vcs governing the monitoring of high risk sex offenders living in California. He also advocated for the passage of Proposition 83, a law against sexual predators based on Jessica's Law. He also helped write Marsy's Law, an amendment to the state's constitution to expand the legal rights of victims of crime which was passed in 2008. He served as spokesperson and campaign manager for the initiative to pass the amendment. Spitzer later served as legal affairs director of Marsy's Law for All, an organization representing victims of crime.

Return to Orange County District Attorney's office 

A June 2004 Los Angeles Times article described a "long-simmering feud between Orange County [District Attorney] Tony Rackauckas and [...] Spitzer." In October 2004, Spitzer accused Rackauckas of "[poisoning] trust in local law enforcement". According to OC Weekly, in 2004, Spitzer was not only running for re-election to the State Assembly, he was privately seeking advice, support, and building a campaign to challenge Rackauckas in 2006. Spitzer eventually decided not to run and instead reached an agreement with Rackauckas to become a prosecutor and run in the 2014 election with Rackauckas's blessing.

In 2008, Rackauckas appointed Spitzer as assistant district attorney. As a prosecutor in Orange County, Spitzer handled criminal matters and supervised line prosecutors. He was fired two years later in 2010. Rackauckas said that he fired Spitzer for inappropriate behavior in the workplace and intimidating other workers. Spitzer was inquiring for information from the Orange County Public Administrator and Public Guardian, John Williams, at the behest of a domestic violence victim. According to the news website Voice of OC, the fact that Rackauckas's fiancée, Peggy Buff, was Williams's deputy further fueled the controversy. By this point, Spitzer had also indicated his intention to run in the 2014 District Attorney election but Rackauckas announced that he planned "to run for another term in 2014 to stop [him]". Spitzer returned to private practice and prepared to run for a Board of Supervisors seat in 2012.

Re-election to the Orange County Board of Supervisors 
In June 2012, Spitzer beat Deborah Pauly, a fellow Republican, to again become a member of the Orange County Board of Supervisors, serving the same 3rd supervisorial district he had represented from 1997 to 2002.

By early 2015, Spitzer had become chairman of the Orange County Board of Supervisors. In April 2015, Spitzer, a former reserve police officer, handcuffed a man who he felt was behaving aggressively towards him, then called 911 at the Wahoo's Fish Taco restaurant in Foothill Ranch, California. The man was questioned about the incident, but was released by Orange County Sheriff's Department deputies. At the time, Spitzer had with him a bag containing his handgun and a valid permit to carry a concealed weapon. When news of the incident was reported in the press in September 2015, Orange County Sheriff Sandra Hutchens said that she did not "think [Spitzer] did anything wrong … He perceived a threat. He acted upon that … It was resolved; nobody got injured, and it was over." In August 2017, as the result of a Superior Court lawsuit, Orange County was required to cover the legal fees that Voice of OC spent in order to get the county to release emails and other documents.

In September 2017, Christine Richters, a former aide to Spitzer, also sued the county accusing Spitzer of wrongful termination. The county reached to an agreement with Richters for a $150,000 settlement for unpaid overtime which was approved by a unanimous vote of the Board of Supervisors including Spitzer.

Orange County District Attorney 
Spitzer challenged Rackauckas in the 2018 Orange County District Attorney election. The first round was held in June 2018 with Spitzer earning 35% of the vote to Rackauckas's 38%, leading to a second round. On November 6, 2018, Spitzer earned 53.2% of the vote to win against the incumbent. Replacing Rackauckas who had held the position since 1999, Spitzer became the county's first new district attorney in 20 years when he was sworn-in on January 7, 2019.

As District Attorney, Spitzer has criticized the moratorium on the death penalty in California, ordered by Governor Gavin Newsom in March 2019. Spitzer has put public pressure on Newsom to rescind the order, holding press conferences with the families of murder victims whose convicted murderers are serving time on death row. In 2020, he was one of the several county district attorneys that prosecuted Joseph James DeAngelo (also known as the Golden State Killer) who pleaded guilty and was sentenced to life in prison without parole. During the sentencing hearing on August 21, Spitzer told DeAngelo he would have liked to see him executed but agreed to a plea deal after meeting with the victims and their families, and considering "the age of the case." Spitzer added addressing the victims, "We knew how long [the case] took to solve. And we knew that this was the right thing to do – so you could all be here today in your lifetime."

During his 2018 campaign for District Attorney, Spitzer had criticized his predecessor's genetic surveillance program, whereby the county uses minor offenses to collect and expand its own DNA database, saying that the program can possibly be abused. When he became District Attorney in January 2019, Spitzer reviewed the program and authorized its continuation. A lawsuit filed against the program was dismissed in June 2021 by Judge William D. Claster of the Orange County Superior Court.

On June 3, 2022, Orange County Superior Court Judge Gregg Prickett ruled, without explanation or making any record, that Spitzer had violated the state’s Racial Justice Act, which prohibits prosecutors from seeking criminal sentences on the basis of race, ethnicity, or national origin. The ruling focused on remarks Spitzer made to other prosecutors when deciding on pursuing the death penalty against a Black defendant. Spitzer contended that was entirely appropriate for him to bring up these questions when discussing whether to seek the death penalty, because he "simply was exploring {the defendant's] ability to identify, properly or not, the race of the female victim in that moment in a darkened room before he executed his two victims." The defendant killed a women who happened to be white, just like his ex-girlfriend who he was stalking for dating other men.

Personal life 
In mid 2009, Spitzer, whose mother had died the year before from colon cancer, was himself diagnosed with laryngeal cancer. He underwent successful radiation therapy treatment at the UC Irvine Medical Center and has said that he "never missed a day of work."

Spitzer is married to Jamie Morris Spitzer who serves as the presiding judge on the Workers' Compensation Appeals Board. They have a son and a daughter.

Awards and recognition 
As deputy district attorney of Orange County, Spitzer developed an interest in victims' rights. Spitzer was voted Outstanding Prosecutor by the Orange County District Attorney's office in 1994 and the local chapter of Mothers Against Drunk Driving honored him with its Outstanding Prosecutor Award in 1996.

Spitzer serves as an honorary board member of the Doris Tate Crime Victims Bureau (renamed Crime Victims Action Alliance) and as a board member of Crime Survivors, Inc., and the Orange County's Trauma Intervention Program (TIP). He also served as a member of the Orange County Bar Association Administration of Justice Committee. He was on the advisory board for the Orange County Council of the Boy Scouts of America, along with California assemblyman James Silva, and former State Senator Van Tran. In 2003, he received that organization's Visionary Award, given annually to a person who exemplifies the attributes of the Scout Oath and Law, and who has demonstrated leadership and philanthropy in the Hispanic and Latino communities.

In 2007, Spitzer was inducted into the Schurr High School Hall of Fame.

Electoral history

Orange County, California District Attorney

References

External links 
 Official website of Todd Spitzer
 Join California Todd Spitzer

|-

|-

|-

|-

|-

1960 births
Living people
District attorneys in California
Los Angeles Police Department officers
Democratic Party members of the California State Assembly
Orange County Supervisors
People from Whittier, California
People from Greater Los Angeles
University of California, Hastings College of the Law alumni
University of California, Los Angeles alumni
University of California, Berkeley alumni
21st-century American politicians